Gay McKenna was an Irish greyhound trainer who won the Irish Greyhound Derby five times. He was considered the leading trainer in Ireland from 1960 until 1972.

Early life 
McKenna was born in Birr, County Offaly. He operated his kennels at Cabinteely, Dublin. He was introduced to the sport by his father Joe McKenna who had two finalists in the 1934 Irish Greyhound Derby and won the 1936 Irish Grand National.

Career 
After many attempts, in 1965 he won the Irish Greyhound Derby with Ballyowen Chief. He repeated the feat a year later  with Always Proud. In 1971, Monalee Pride provided the third success for and a fourth and final win in 1972 by Catsrock Daisy.

In addition, McKenna also won the Irish Oaks with Drumsough Princess (1965) and Rosmore Robin (1970), the Irish Cesarewitch with Postal Vote (1970) and Rita's Choice (1973), and the Irish National Sprint with Skip's Choice (1960).

The four Irish Derby titles remains a record today equalled only by his brother-in-law Tom Lynch.

Death 
McKenna died during the 2004 Irish Derby on 10 September. That final was won by Owen McKenna (Gay's first cousin once removed) and the runner up was trained by Fraser Black (McKenna's son-in-law).

References 

Sportspeople from County Offaly
2004 deaths
People from Birr, County Offaly
Irish greyhound racing trainers